Annie Lemay (born May 16, 1977) is a Canadian curler from Aylmer, Quebec.

Career
Lemay has won eight provincial titles. At the 1999 and 2000 Tournament of Hearts, she played second for Janique Berthelot. In 2000, she moved to the Marie-France Larouche team to play as her second and won provincial titles with her in 2001, 2004, 2008, 2009 and 2016 as her second and as her third in 2011. In 2004, the team made it to the finals, losing to Colleen Jones. Lemay also played in the 2013 Hearts as the alternate for Quebec.

Lemay won the 2021 Canadian Mixed Curling Championship playing lead on Team Quebec, skipped by her husband, Jean-Michel Ménard.

Personal life
Lemay is married to 2006 Brier champion skip Jean-Michel Ménard. They have two children. Lemay is employed by the Canada Revenue Agency.

References

External links
 

1977 births
Canadian women curlers
Curlers from Quebec
French Quebecers
Living people
Sportspeople from Gatineau
Sportspeople from Trois-Rivières
Continental Cup of Curling participants
Canada Cup (curling) participants
World mixed curling champions
Canadian mixed curling champions